Pennsylvania's 6th congressional district is a district in the state of Pennsylvania. It includes all of Chester County, the city of Reading, and Reading's southeastern suburbs in Berks County. The district is represented by Democrat Chrissy Houlahan, who has served in Congress since 2019. As currently drawn, the district is among the wealthiest in Pennsylvania. The Supreme Court of Pennsylvania redrew the district in February 2018 after ruling the previous map unconstitutional.

Elections

Jim Gerlach served as the district's Representative from 2003 to 2014. In 2004 and 2006, Gerlach won re-election against fellow attorney and now Montgomery County Court of Common Pleas Judge Lois Murphy. In 2008, he successfully ran for re-election against businessman and veteran Bob Roggio. In the 2010 and 2012 elections, Gerlach defeated physician and Iraq War veteran Manan Trivedi, the Democratic nominee.

In January 2014, Gerlach announced that he would not stand for reelection to the 114th Congress.  In the race to succeed Gerlach, Chester County Commissioner Ryan Costello won the Republican nomination and physician and Iraq war veteran Manan Trivedi secured the Democratic party's nomination.

In February 2018, following the Supreme Court of Pennsylvania's ordered redrawing of congressional districts, Costello announced he would not stand for reelection and retire at the end of the 115th Congress, leaving businessman Greg McCauley as the sole Republican candidate while the Democrats nominated Air Force veteran Chrissy Houlahan. Houlahan defeated  McCauley in the general election.

Geography

2003 to 2012
Prior to the court-ordered redistricting, the 6th district's incarnation dated back to 2002. Its strange shape brought charges of gerrymandering by Democrats who argued it "looms like a dragon descending on Philadelphia from the west, splitting up towns and communities throughout Montgomery and Berks Counties." The combination of very affluent suburban areas of Philadelphia and sparsely populated rural areas was possibly designed to capture Republican voters, but changes in voting patterns in southeastern Pennsylvania has made the district much more competitive. The district had a Cook Partisan Voting Index score of R+1 after the 2012 redistricting. It was rated D+4 before then. The district included parts of Montgomery County, Chester County, Berks County and Lehigh County. The largest cities in the district were Reading and Norristown.

2013 to 2018

The redistricting of 2011/2012 changed it to include parts of Chester, Montgomery, Berks and Lebanon counties. The following municipalities constituted the sixth district:

Berks County

Chester County

Lebanon County

Montgomery County

2019

The court-ordered map made the 6th a more compact district in Berks and Chester counties.

List of members representing the district

1791–1793: One seat

1795–1823: One seat, then two 
District created in 1795.

1823 – present: One seat

Recent election results

2012

2014

2016

2018

2020

2022

Historical district boundaries

See also
List of United States congressional districts
Pennsylvania's congressional districts

References

 Congressional Biographical Directory of the United States 1774–present

External links
 Congressional redistricting in Pennsylvania

06
Constituencies established in 1791
1791 establishments in Pennsylvania
Constituencies disestablished in 1793
1793 disestablishments in Pennsylvania
Constituencies established in 1795
1795 establishments in Pennsylvania